In algebraic geometry, Le Potier's vanishing theorem is an extension of the Kodaira vanishing theorem, on vector bundle. The theorem states the following

In case of r = 1, and let E is an ample (or positive) line bundle on X, this theorem is equivalent to the Nakano vanishing theorem. Also,  found the another proof

 generalizes Le Potier's vanishing theorem to k-ample and the statement as follows:

 gave a counterexample, which is as follows:

See also 
vanishing theorem
Barth–Lefschetz theorem

Note

Reference

Further reading

External links
 (OpenContent book)

Theorems in algebraic geometry
Theorems in complex geometry